Alexandra Ivy is an American novelist mostly known for her New York Times Best Selling contemporary paranormal series Guardians of Eternity. She also writes regency historicals using the name Deborah or Debbie Raleigh. Her writing has gained high acclaim in the romance genre, earning Romantic Times magazine 'Top Pick' nominations for When Darkness Comes and Embrace the Darkness.

Bibliography as Alexandra Ivy

Guardians of Eternity series

Novels
When Darkness Comes (2007) 
Embrace the Darkness (2007) 
Darkness Everlasting (2008) 
Darkness Revealed (2009) 
Darkness Unleashed (2009) 
Beyond the Darkness (2010) 
Devoured by Darkness (2010) 
Bound by Darkness (2011) 
Fear the Darkness (2012) 
Darkness Avenged (2013) 
Hunt the Darkness (2014) 
When Darkness Ends (2015) 
Darkness Returns (2019)

Dragons of Eternity series
Burned by Darkness (2015)
Scorched by Darkness (2016)

Short Stories
Taken by Darkness [Guardians of Eternity, Book 7.5] in the Yours for Eternity anthology with Hannah Howell and Kaitlin O'Riley. (2011) 
Darkness Eternal [Guardians of Eternity, Book 7.6] in the Supernatural anthology with Larissa Ione, Jacquelyn Frank, and G.A. Aiken. (2011) 
Where Darkness Lives [Guardians of Eternity, Book 8.5] in The Real Werewives of Vampire County anthology with Angie Fox, Jess Haines, and Tami Dane. (2011) 
Levet [Guardians of Eternity, Book 9.5] e-book
A Very Levet Christmas [Guardians of Eternity, Book 11.5] e-book

Immortal Rogues trilogy
My Lord Vampire (2012)  - This is a reprint from the 2003 historical vampire series written as Deborah Raleigh
My Lord Eternity (2012)  - This is a reprint from the 2003 historical vampire series written as Deborah Raleigh
My Lord Immortality (2012)  - This is a reprint from the 2003 historical vampire series written as Deborah Raleigh

Sentinels series

Novels
Born in Blood (2013) 
Blood Assassin (2014) 
Blood Lust (May 2016)

Short Stories
Out of Control [Sentinels, Book 0.5] in the Predatory anthology with Nina Bangs, Dianne Duvall, and Hannah Jayne (2013) 
On the Hunt [Sentinels, Book 2.5] in the On the Hunt anthology with Rebecca Zanetti, Dianne Duvall, and Hannah Jayne (2015)

Rapture series
First Rapture (2013) e-book
Sinful Rapture (2014) e-book
Sweet Rapture (2016) e-book

Bayou Heat (with Laura Wright)
Each book in this series has one book written by each author

Novels
Raphael/Parish (2013)  
Bayon/Jean-Baptiste (2013) 
Talon/Xavier (2013) 
Sebastian/Aristide (2013) 
Lian/Roch (2014) 
Hakan/Severin (2014) 
Angel/Hiss (2015) 
Rage/Killian (2015) 
Michel/Striker (2015) 
Ice/Reaux (January 18, 2016) 
Kayden/Simon (August 9, 2016)

Short Stories
Bayou Noel [Bayou Heat, Book 3.5] (2013)

Illegitimate Bachelor
Bedding the Baron (2014) e-book reprint of a 2008 historical romance novel written as Deborah Raleigh
Seducing the Viscount (2014) e-book reprint of a 2008 historical romance novel written as Deborah Raleigh
Seduce Me By Christmas (2014) e-book reprint of a 2008 historical romance novel written as Deborah Raleigh

Hellion's Den series
Some Like It Wicked (2014)
Some Like It Sinfull (2014)
Some Like It Brazen (2014)

Bibliography as Deborah 'Debbie' Raleigh

A Rose for Three Rakes trilogy
A Bride for Lord Challmond (2001) 
A Bride for Lord Wickton (2001) 
A Bride for Lord Brasleigh (2001)

Vicar Humbley trilogy
A Proper Marriage (2002) 
A Convenient Marriage (2002) 
A Scandalous Marriage (2003)

Immortal Rogues trilogy
My Lord Vampire (2003) 
My Lord Eternity (2003) 
My Lord Immortality (2003)

Single Novels
Lord Carlston's Courtship (2000) 
Lord Mumford's Minx (2000) 
The Christmas Wish (2001) 
The Valentine Wish (2002)
The Wedding Wish (2002) 
Miss Frazer's Adventure (2005) 
The Wedding Clause (2005) 
Some Like It Wicked (2005)
Some Like It Sinful (2006) 
Some Like It Brazen (2007) 
Bedding the Baron (2008) 
Seducing the Viscount (2009) 
Seduce My by Christmas (2009)

Short Stories
The Naughty Kitten in the Spring Kittens anthology with Alana Clayton and Kate Huntington. (2000) 
The Merry Cupids in the Valentine Rogues anthology with Cindy Holbrook and Donna Simpson. (2001) 
Christmas Miracle in the Christmas Eve Kittens anthology with Cathleen Clare and Wilma Counts. (2001) 
One Night with Lucifer in the Only with a Rogue anthology with Adrienne Basso and Colleen Faulkner. (2002) 
Night of Seduction in the One Night with a Rogue anthology with Candace McCarthy and Linda Madl. (2002) 
The Elusive Bride in the A Taste of Christmas anthology with Alice Holden and Joy Reed. (2002) 
A Mother at Heart in the A Husband for Mama anthology with Mary Blayney and Julia Parks. (2003) 
The Bewitchment of Lord Dalford in the A Bewitching Season anthology with Lynn Collum and Jeanne Savery. (2003) 
"Marlow's Nemesis" in the My Favorite Rogue anthology with Lynn Collum and Victoria Hinshaw. (2004) 
To Woo a Duke in the How to Marry a Duke anthology with Sandy Blair and Regan Allen. (2005) 
To Tame the Beast in the Highland Vampire anthology with Hannah Howell and Adrienne Basso.(2005)

References

External links
 The official Deborah Raleigh site

21st-century American novelists
American fantasy writers
American women novelists
Living people
Year of birth missing (living people)
American romantic fiction writers
Women science fiction and fantasy writers
Women romantic fiction writers
21st-century American women writers